Gebroeders Ko is a Dutch musical duo, consisting of the brothers Ton and Gerard Koopmans. Their name literally means "The Ko Brothers" and they are known for their Dutch spoofs of "Boten Anna" by Basshunter and "Dragostea Din Tei" by O-Zone.

Their 2007 single "Duiken in de zee" is based on the melody of Funiculì, Funiculà, a famous Italian song written by Luigi Denza in 1880. 

They have made a single "Vuvuzela" named after the South African instrument vuvuzela for the 2010 FIFA World Cup which was held in South Africa.

Songs of Gebroeders Ko not only became famous in the Netherlands but also within the German Mallorca scenery. German versions recorded by Mickie Krause were hits in all German speaking countries.

Discography

Albums

Studio albums

Compilation albums

Video albums

Singles

As lead artist

As featured artist

References 

Musical groups from North Brabant